is a Japanese film director and screenwriter.

Filmography
Totoshi: Taagetto 1: Seifuku o Nuida Bijin Hisho (1998)
Crazy Lips (2000)
Gore from Outer Space (2001)
Chi o Sū Uchū: Gaiden: Henshin (2002)
Kaidan Shin Mimibukuro: Tokubetsuhen: Kamon (2003)
Akuma no Keiji (Deka) Matsuri (2004)
Gakkō no Kaidan (2007)

References

External links

1961 births
Living people
Japanese film directors
Japanese screenwriters
People from Hokkaido